Tipulamima seyrigi is a moth of the family Sesiidae. It is known from Madagascar.

The wingspan of this species is 33 mm with a length of the forewings of 15-15.5 mm. The forewings are hyaline (glass like) in the cell and yellowish grey at the costa. This species was named after A.Seyrig who collected the holotype in Bekily, southern Madagascar

References

Sesiidae
Moths described in 1955
Moths of Madagascar
Moths of Africa